Kelly Deguchi is a Canadian judoka. She won the silver medal in Judo at the 2022 Commonwealth Games – Women's 52 kg .  She is the younger sister of Christa Deguchi, also a judoka.

References

External links
 
 

1999 births
Living people
Canadian female judoka
Commonwealth Games silver medallists for Canada
Commonwealth Games medallists in judo
Judoka at the 2022 Commonwealth Games
20th-century Canadian women
21st-century Canadian women
Medallists at the 2022 Commonwealth Games